Local elections in Siquijor held on May 9, 2016 as part of the 2016 Philippine general election. Voters elected all local posts in the province: a town mayor, vice mayor, town councilors, as well as members of the Sangguniang Panlalawigan - three in each of the province's two administrative districts, the governor, vice governor, and one representative for lone district of Siquijor.

A total of 189 candidates are running for all local positions in the province and in six municipalities of Siquijor.

The total number of registered voters in the province is 68,988.

Congressional Election Result

Lone District, Congressman
City: none
Municipality: Enrique Villanueva, Larena, Lazi, Maria, San Juan, Siquijor
Population (2010):  91,066

Marie Anne Pernes is the incumbent. Parties are stated in their certificates of candidacy.

Provincial Election Results

Governor
Zaldy Villa is the incumbent. Parties are stated in their certificates of candidacy.

Vice-Governor
Fernando "Dingdong" Avanzado is the incumbent. However, he is not seeking for reelection.

Sangguniang Panlalawigan

1st District
Municipalities: Enrique Villanueva, Larena, Siquijor
Parties are as stated in their certificates of candidacy.

|bgcolor=black colspan=5|

2nd District
Municipalities: Maria, Lazi, San Juan
Parties are as stated in their certificates of candidacy. 

|bgcolor=black colspan=5|

Municipal Election Results
All municipalities of Siquijor elected mayor, vice-mayor and councilors this election. The mayor and vice mayor with the highest number of votes win the seat; they are voted separately, therefore, they may be of different parties when elected. Below is the list of Mayoral and vice-Mayoral candidates of each municipalities of the province.

Enrique Villanueva
Voter Population (2016):  4,836
Gerold Pal-ing is the incumbent.

Leonardo Paculba is the incumbent.

Larena
Voter Population (2016):  10,393
Dean Villa is the incumbent.

Cyrus Gold Calibo is the incumbent.

Lazi
Voter Population (2016):  14,279
Orpheus Fua is the incumbent. However is ineligible for reelection due to term limits.

James Monte is term limited. He is running for mayor.

Maria
Voter Population (2016):  10,079
Meynard Asok is the incumbent.

Orlando Fernando is the incumbent.

San Juan
Voter Population (2016):  10,037
Wilfredo Capundag Jr. is the incumbent.

Lillian Fe Sumalpong is the incumbent.

Siquijor
Voter Population (2016):  19,364
Mei Ling Quezon is term limited. She is running for vice-governor.

Richard Quezon is term limited. He is running for mayor.

References

External links
COMELEC - Official website of the Philippine Commission on Elections (COMELEC)
NAMFREL - Official website of National Movement for Free Elections (NAMFREL)
PPCRV - Official website of the Parish Pastoral Council for Responsible Voting (PPCRV)

2016 Philippine local elections